Abo Taleb El Essawi (born 11 Dewcember 1963) is an Egyptian football manager.

References

1963 births
Living people
Egyptian footballers
People from Benha
Ismaily SC players
Egyptian football managers
Ismaily SC managers
Egyptian expatriate football managers
Expatriate football managers in Oman
Egyptian expatriate sportspeople in Oman
Egyptian Premier League managers
Association footballers not categorized by position